Yvonne Lowrene Wright (October 31, 1951 – January 26, 2016) was an American songwriter and vocalist best known for co-writing with Stevie Wonder in the 1970s. Their songs appear on the albums Music of My Mind, Talking Book, Fulfillingness' First Finale, and Stevie Wonder's Journey Through "The Secret Life of Plants".

She is not known to be related to singer-songwriter Syreeta Wright, who also worked with, and was married to, Wonder.

Biography
Yvonne Lowrene Wright-Willis was born in Harlem, New York City, United States, to Harry Wright and Margaret Williams in 1951. Wright's mother Margaret was briefly a member of the dance troupe, Whitey's Lindy Hoppers.

As a child Wright sang in her church choir, where she and her older sister Adele were given solos on songs such as James Cleveland's "Two Wings". As a teen Wright and her friends formed vocal groups the Diamonds and the Velveteens. While still a teenager, she performed "Moon River" at Amateur Night at the Apollo Theater and was enlisted to sing background for Wilson Pickett on that same stage.

Always a prolific writer, she met Stevie Wonder in the early 1970s and collaborated on six songs over four albums from 1972 to 1979. Their 1972 song "You've Got It Bad Girl" was the B-side to the number 1 single "Superstition". "They Won't Go When I Go" (1974) appeared on the number 1 album Fulfillingness' First Finale, which was named Grammy Album of the Year. In 1974 Jet magazine described Wright as Wonder's "girl friend". Their songs have been covered by many artists including Art Garfunkel, George Michael, Herbie Hancock, Michael McDonald, and Josh Groban.

Wright also sang background vocals on Minnie Riperton's "The Edge Of A Dream", from Riperton's 1974 breakthrough album Perfect Angel, produced by Wonder.

Wright continued to sing live in the 1970s and early 1980s. In 1975, she performed in a touring production of Hair in Spain. She sang background vocals for Lou Rawls and Millie Jackson. She was a featured vocalist in touring line-ups for the Chantels and the Marvelettes, as well as on numerous recordings.

Later in life she returned to study in Dallas, Texas, and earned a BSc and her MS in Special Education.

Selective discography as songwriter
All songs written by Stevie Wonder and Yvonne Wright.

Singles

Album tracks

References

External links
Yvonne Wright at Discogs
Yvonne Wright at Allmusic

1951 births
2016 deaths
African-American songwriters
Motown artists
American women songwriters
20th-century African-American people
People from Harlem
21st-century African-American people
20th-century African-American women
21st-century African-American women